Blue Mountain City is a former settlement in Calaveras County, California, along Licking Fork, approximately  northeast of Mountain Ranch.  A post office operated in Blue Mountain from 1863 to 1864.

Blue Mountain is also the name of a mining district located 10 miles southeast of West Point, California that includes the Black Wonder, Gold King and Heckendorn mines.

References

Further reading
 
 

Former settlements in Calaveras County, California
Former populated places in California